The Church of St Paul is in Derby Lane, Stoneycroft, Liverpool, England. It is recorded in the National Heritage List for England as a designated Grade II* listed building. It was designed by Giles Gilbert Scott, who also designed the Anglican Liverpool Cathedral.

In 2016 the building was closed with a view to selling it to the Coptic Orthodox Church. Its benefice was united with that of St Anne, Stanley.

History

Church of England
The church was built between 1913 and 1916, and was paid for by H. Douglas Horsfall. The church has been restored three times; in 1955, in 1972 and in 1998–2013.

Coptic Orthodox Church
In 2016 the building was sold to the Coptic Orthodox Diocese of the Midlands and is now St. Mary & St. Cyril's Coptic Orthodox Church.

Architecture

Exterior
St Paul's is constructed with a concrete core, lined internally and externally with brick. It has stone bands and dressings, and a tiled roof. It consists of a nave and chancel without division, north and south narrow (passage) aisles, three north and south transepts, and a large central tower. The tower has a round-arched recess on each side containing round-headed two-light bell openings, which have louvres and Y-tracery. On top of the tower is a pyramidal roof. The southeast corner of the tower is chamfered and contains a canted stair turret surmounted by a pinnacle. At the west end are three lancet windows in an arched recess; it is flanked on each side by a porch. Each transept has a half-hipped gable, and contains windows similar to those at the west end. The east wall is blank, and there are four-light windows in the north and south walls of the chancel. The aisles have rose windows.

Interior
The interior of the church is plain, being entirely rendered other than for areas of exposed brick acting as dressings. It is effectively in three bays, each with a square groin vault, which are joined to each other by pointed tunnel vaults. Steps lead up to the chancel, whose south transept contains a chapel, and the north transept an organ loft and vestry. The low chancel wall has a canted pulpit at each end. The three-manual pipe organ was built in 1916 by Rushworth and Dreaper at a cost of about £1,000.  The organ case dates from the 18th century and was originally in the former St Paul's Church, which has been demolished.  It is decorated with carving by Grinling Gibbons.  In the tower are two bells, which were also moved from the old St Paul's. The older bell dates from 1775, and the newer, larger bell was cast in 1861 in Murphy's Bell Foundry, Dublin. The bells were restored in 1975 at the Whitechapel Bell Foundry.

See also

Grade II* listed buildings in Merseyside

References

Notes

Citations

External links
St. Mary & St. Cyril Coptic Orthodox Church

Church of St Paul
Gothic Revival church buildings in England
Grade II* listed churches in Merseyside
Church of St Paul
Anglican Diocese of Liverpool
Church of England church buildings in Merseyside
Giles Gilbert Scott church buildings
Churches completed in 1916
20th-century Church of England church buildings
Coptic Orthodox churches in the United Kingdom